Sphaeridium is a genus of beetles in the family Hydrophilidae, the water scavenger beetles. They occur in Europe, and some species have been introduced to North America.

Description
The adults are 4 to 7.5 millimeters long. They have short antennae with hairy clubs at the tips.

These beetles live in cow dung. The adults feed on the dung and other organic matter, but the beetle larvae are predators of the maggots of the flies that breed in the dung, such as the face fly (Musca autumnalis). Two or more Sphaeridium beetle species may coexist in one pat, and the larvae may feed on each other. The female beetle deposits several eggs encased in a cocoon.

Species
Species include:

Sphaeridium abbreviatum Boheman, 1851
Sphaeridium abditum Orchymont, 1943
Sphaeridium abductum J.Balfour-Browne, 1950
Sphaeridium affine Berge Henegouwen, 1987
Sphaeridium aschenborni Berge Henegouwen, 1992
Sphaeridium balfourbrownei M.Hansen, 1999
Sphaeridium bipunctatum Thunberg, 1794
Sphaeridium bipustulatum Fabricius, 1781
Sphaeridium bisinuatum J.Balfour-Browne, 1950
Sphaeridium bottegoi Marcuzzi, 1941
Sphaeridium braziliense Berge Henegouwen, 1986
Sphaeridium caffrum Laporte de Castelnau, 1840
Sphaeridium chrysomelinum (Klug, 1833)
Sphaeridium circumcinctum Régimbart, 1907
Sphaeridium corradinii Marcuzzi, 1941
Sphaeridium daemonicum Fikáček & Kropáček, 2015
Sphaeridium densepunctatum Berlov & Shatrovskiy, 1989
Sphaeridium dimidiatum Gory, 1834
Sphaeridium discolor Orchymont, 1933
Sphaeridium dolum J.Balfour-Browne, 1950
Sphaeridium exile Boheman, 1851
Sphaeridium eximium Berge Henegouwen, 1992
Sphaeridium fallaciosum J.Balfour-Browne, 1950
Sphaeridium flavomaculatum Orchymont, 1924
Sphaeridium huijbregtsi Berge Henegouwen, 1986
Sphaeridium inopinatum J.Balfour-Browne, 1958
Sphaeridium inquinatum Kugelann, 1798
Sphaeridium jongemai Berge Henegouwen, 1987
Sphaeridium kolleri Orchymont, 1925
Sphaeridium lunatum Fabricius, 1792
Sphaeridium marginatum Fabricius, 1787
Sphaeridium melanarium Gistel, 1831
Sphaeridium ornatum Boheman, 1851
Sphaeridium ortivum Orchymont, 1943
Sphaeridium pellucidum Rossi, 1794
Sphaeridium plagiatum Thunberg, 1794
Sphaeridium punctiforme Schrank, 1798
Sphaeridium quinquemaculatum Fabricius, 1798
Sphaeridium rubrum Thunberg, 1794
Sphaeridium ruficolle Frolich, 1792
Sphaeridium rufipes Schrank, 1785
Sphaeridium scarabaeoides  (Linnaeus, 1758)
Sphaeridium senegalense Laporte de Castelnau, 1840
Sphaeridium seriatum Orchymont, 1913
Sphaeridium severini Orchymont, 1919
Sphaeridium sigillum Orchymont, 1943
Sphaeridium simplicipes Marcuzzi, 1941
Sphaeridium substriatum Faldermann, 1838
Sphaeridium testudineum Rossi, 1794
Sphaeridium thomsoni Orchymont, 1919
Sphaeridium vaccarium Kugelann, 1798
Sphaeridium vitalisi Orchymont, 1925
Sphaeridium weiri Berge Henegouwen, 1992

References

Further reading
Otronen, M., & Hanski, I. (1983). Movement patterns in Sphaeridium: differences between species, sexes, and feeding and breeding individuals. Journal of Animal Ecology 52, 663-680.

Hydrophilidae genera